In graph theory, a weak coloring is a special case of a graph labeling. A weak -coloring of a graph  assigns a color } to each vertex , such that each non-isolated vertex  is adjacent to at least one vertex with different color.

The figure on the right shows a weak 2-coloring of a graph. Each dark vertex (color 1) is adjacent to at least one light vertex (color 2) and vice versa.

Properties
A graph vertex coloring is a weak coloring, but not necessarily vice versa.

Every graph has a weak 2-coloring. The figure on the right illustrates a simple algorithm for constructing a weak 2-coloring in an arbitrary graph. Part (a) shows the original graph. Part (b) shows a breadth-first search tree of the same graph. Part (c) shows how to color the tree: starting from the root, the layers of the tree are colored alternatingly with colors 1 (dark) and 2 (light).

Applications
Historically, weak coloring served as the first non-trivial example of a graph problem that can be solved with a local algorithm (a distributed algorithm that runs in a constant number of synchronous communication rounds). More precisely, if the degree of each node is odd and bounded by a constant, then there is a constant-time distributed algorithm for weak 2-coloring.

This is different from (non-weak) vertex coloring: there is no constant-time distributed algorithm for vertex coloring; the best possible algorithms (for finding a minimal but not necessarily minimum coloring) require  communication rounds. Here  is the iterated logarithm of .

References

Graph coloring
Distributed algorithms
Distributed computing problems